Elena Viktorovna Zharkova (12 July 1953 – 4 November 1980) was a Russian ice dancer who represented the Soviet Union. With Gennadi Karponosov, she won three medals at the Prize of Moscow News medalist and four at the Soviet Championships. The duo finished in the top eight at three World Championships and in the top six at three European Figure Skating Championships. They were coached by Elena Tchaikovskaia in Moscow.

Competitive highlights 
With Karponosov

References 

1953 births
1980 deaths
Russian female ice dancers
Soviet female ice dancers
Figure skaters from Moscow
Universiade gold medalists for the Soviet Union
Universiade medalists in figure skating
Competitors at the 1972 Winter Universiade